Sunflower butter, also known as sunflower seed butter, is a food paste made from sunflower seeds. Sunflower butter is commonly used as a substitute for peanut butter when allergies are a concern.

History
U.S. commercial versions of sunflower butter were first introduced in the early 1980s as alternatives to peanut butter, particularly for those with nut allergies or peanut allergies. These attempts were unsuccessful, which was attributed to issues with its greenish appearance, "poor texture",  and a bitter, under-roasted taste.

Two decades later, in 2000, researchers at the Agricultural Research Service of the Department of Agriculture, working with sunflower seed processor Red River Commodities, developed a formulation that "resembled the texture, flavor, and nutty appearance of commercially available peanut butter", focusing on the degree of roasting and the amounts of sugar, salt, and stabilizer (hydrogenated cottonseed and rapeseed oils). Their subsidiary, SunGold Foods, Inc., introduced their sunflower seed butter, marketed under the name SunButter, in 2002. By 2011, SunButter became available at major grocery retailers.

Several major grocery chains and online retailers now produce store-brand sunflower butter.

Health

Sunflower seeds are a good source of protein, fiber, vitamin E, zinc and iron.

They are also rich in alpha-tocopherols, which have been associated with a reduced risk of certain types of cancers.

Due to the prevalence of peanut allergies in the US, many American schools are offering peanut-free menu options or implementing entirely nut-free policies. Sunflower butter can provide an alternative in schools where peanut butter and other nuts have been banned. However, a small number of people with peanut allergies may also be allergic to sunflower seed butter. According to one study, a person with a known peanut allergy suffered an acute reaction to a "nut-free" butter containing sunflower seeds.

Sunflower butter can also be used as a dip for fruit and vegetables, in a sandwich, or in recipes that call for peanut butter; peanut butter, however, contains higher levels of protein.

See also
 List of spreads

References

Nut and seed butters
Helianthus